is a former Japanese football player.

Playing career
Kawaguchi was born in Sanjo on April 10, 1975. After graduating from Juntendo University, he joined J1 League club Júbilo Iwata in 1998. He played many matches as forward from first season and the club won the champions 1998 Emperor's Cup. At the Final, he scored 2 goals and was selected MVP award. The club also won the champions 1998–99 Asian Club Championship first Asian title in club history. From 2000, he also played many matches as substitute right side midfielder not only forward. The club won the champions 2002 J1 League and 2003 Emperor's Cup. However his opportunity to play decreased from 2004. On 2006, he moved to FC Tokyo. Although he played many matches in 2006, his opportunity to play decreased from 2007 and he retired end of 2008 season.

Club statistics

Honors and awards

Individual
 J.League Cup MVP: 1998

Club
Júbilo Iwata
 AFC Champions League: 1998–99
 Asian Super Cup: 1999
 J1 League: 1999, 2002
 J.League Cup: 1998
 Japanese Super Cup: 2000, 2003

References

External links

1975 births
Living people
Juntendo University alumni
Association football people from Niigata Prefecture
Japanese footballers
J1 League players
Júbilo Iwata players
FC Tokyo players
Association football forwards